MCISD may refer to one of the following school districts:

McCamey Independent School District
McMullen County Independent School District
Mirando City Independent School District
Mission Consolidated Independent School District
Monroe County Intermediate School District
Munday Consolidated Independent School District